This is a list of current and former Roman Catholic churches in the Roman Catholic Archdiocese of Miami.

The cathedral church of the archdiocese is the Cathedral of Mary in Miami. The archdiocese includes 118 parishes and missions divided into 10 deaneries. The oldest church in Miami is the Gesu built in 1896. Other notable churches include St. Patrick Church in Miami Beach, completed in 1929.

Cathedral

Miami-Dade County

East Dade Deanery

Northeast Dade Deanery

Northwest Dade Deanery

South Dade Deanery

West Dade Deanery

Broward County

Northeast Broward Deanery

Northwest Broward Deanery

Southeast Broward Deanery

Southwest Broward Deanery

South Broward Deanery

Monroe Deanery

Other

Eastern Catholic

References

 
Miami